Joaquín Portillo (26 February 1911 – 14 August 1994) was a Spanish actor and writer who was also known as 'Top'.

Biography
Portillo was born in Madrid. He was an actor and writer, known for La fierecilla domada (1956), Uncle Hyacynth (1956) and The Man Who Wagged His Tail (1957). He died on August 14, 1994 in Madrid.

References

External links

1911 births
1994 deaths
20th-century Spanish male actors
Spanish writers
Spanish male film actors
Male actors from Madrid